Thomas Shirley Hele, OBE, MD, FRCP (b Carlisle 24 October 1881 – d Cambridge 23 January 1953) was an academic in the 20th century.

Hele was educated at Carlisle Grammar School ; Sedbergh School; Emmanuel College, Cambridge (Fellow, 1911); and Barts. He was University Lecturer in Biochemistry from 1921; Tutor at Emmanuel from 1922 to 1935; its Master from 1935 to 1951; and Vice-Chancellor of the University of Cambridge from 1943 to 1945.

References 

 

Biochemists
Officers of the Order of the British Empire
Academics of the University of Cambridge
Alumni of Emmanuel College, Cambridge
Fellows of Emmanuel College, Cambridge
Vice-Chancellors of the University of Cambridge
Masters of Emmanuel College, Cambridge
People from Carlisle, Cumbria
1881 births
1953 deaths
Royal Army Medical Corps officers
People educated at Carlisle Grammar School
People educated at Sedbergh School